In Lie theory and related areas of mathematics, a lattice in a locally compact group is a discrete subgroup with the property that the quotient space has finite invariant measure. In the special case of subgroups of Rn, this amounts to the usual geometric notion of a lattice as a periodic subset of points, and both the algebraic structure of lattices and the geometry of the space of all lattices are relatively well understood.

The theory is particularly rich for lattices in semisimple Lie groups or more generally in semisimple algebraic groups over local fields. In particular there is a wealth of rigidity results in this setting, and a celebrated theorem of Grigory Margulis states that in most cases all lattices are obtained as arithmetic groups.

Lattices are also well-studied in some other classes of groups, in particular groups associated to Kac–Moody algebras and automorphisms groups of regular trees (the latter are known as tree lattices).

Lattices are of interest in many areas of mathematics: geometric group theory (as particularly nice examples of discrete groups), in differential geometry (through the construction of locally homogeneous manifolds), in number theory (through arithmetic groups), in ergodic theory (through the study of homogeneous flows on the quotient spaces) and in combinatorics (through the construction of expanding Cayley graphs and other combinatorial objects).

Generalities on lattices

Informal discussion 

Lattices are best thought of as discrete approximations of continuous groups (such as Lie groups). For example, it is intuitively clear that the subgroup  of integer vectors "looks like" the real vector space  in some sense, while both groups are essentially different: one is finitely generated and countable, while the other is not finitely generated and has the cardinality of the continuum.

Rigorously defining the meaning of "approximation of a continuous group by a discrete subgroup" in the previous paragraph in order to get a notion generalising the example  is a matter of what it is designed to achieve. Maybe the most obvious idea is to say that a subgroup "approximates" a larger group is that the larger group can be covered by the translates of a "small" subset by all elements in the subgroups. In a locally compact topological group there are two immediately available notions of "small": topological (a compact, or relatively compact subset) or measure-theoretical (a subset of finite Haar measure). Note that since the Haar measure is a Radon measure, so it gives finite mass to compact subsets, the second definition is more general. The definition of a lattice used in mathematics relies upon the second meaning (in particular to include such examples as ) but the first also has its own interest (such lattices are called uniform). 

Other notions are coarse equivalence and the stronger quasi-isometry. Uniform lattices are quasi-isometric to their ambient groups, but non-uniform ones are not even coarsely equivalent to it.

Definition 

Let  be a locally compact group and  a discrete subgroup (this means that there exists a neighbourhood  of the identity element  of  such that ). Then  is called a lattice in  if in addition there exists a Borel measure  on the quotient space  which is finite (i.e. ) and -invariant (meaning that for any  and any open subset  the equality  is satisfied).

A slightly more sophisticated formulation is as follows: suppose in addition that  is unimodular, then since  is discrete it is also unimodular and by general theorems there exists a unique -invariant Borel measure on  up to scaling. Then  is a lattice if and only if this measure is finite.

A lattice  is called uniform (or cocompact) when the quotient space  is compact (and non-uniform otherwise).

First examples 

The fundamental, and simplest, example is the subgroup  which is a lattice in the Lie group . A slightly more complicated example is given by the discrete Heisenberg group inside the continuous Heisenberg group.

All of these examples are uniform. A non-uniform example is given by the modular group  inside , and also by the higher-dimensional analogues .

Any finite-index subgroup of a lattice is also a lattice in the same group. More generally, a subgroup commensurable to a lattice is a lattice.

Which groups have lattices? 

Not every locally compact group contains a lattice, and there is no general group-theoretical sufficient condition for this. On the other hand, there are plenty of more specific settings where such criteria exist. For example, the existence or non-existence of lattices in Lie groups is a well-understood topic.

As we mentioned, a necessary condition for a group to contain a lattice is that the group must be unimodular. This allows for the easy construction of groups without lattices, for example the group of invertible upper triangular matrices or the affine groups. It is also not very hard to find unimodular groups without lattices, for example certain nilpotent Lie groups as explained below.

A stronger condition than unimodularity is simplicity. This is sufficient to imply the existence of a lattice in a Lie group, but in the more general setting of locally compact groups there exists simple groups without lattices, for example the "Neretin groups".

Lattices in solvable Lie groups

Nilpotent Lie groups 

For nilpotent groups the theory simplifies much from the general case, and stays similar to the case of Abelian groups. All lattices in a nilpotent Lie group are uniform, and if  is a connected simply connected nilpotent Lie group (equivalently it does not contain a nontrivial compact subgroup) then a discrete subgroup is a lattice if and only if it is not contained in a proper connected subgroup (this generalises the fact that a discrete subgroup in a vector space is a lattice if and only if it spans the vector space).

A nilpotent Lie group G contains a lattice if and only if the Lie algebra 𝓰 of G can be defined over the rationals. That is, if and only if the structure constants of 𝓰 are rational numbers. More precisely: In a nilpotent group whose Lie algebra has only rational structure constants, lattices are the images via the exponential map of lattices (in the more elementary sense of Lattice (group)) in the Lie algebra.

A lattice in a nilpotent Lie group  is always finitely generated (and hence finitely presented since it is itself nilpotent); in fact it is generated by at most  elements.

Finally, a nilpotent group is isomorphic to a lattice in a nilpotent Lie group if and only if it contains a subgroup of finite index which is torsion-free and finitely generated.

The general case 

The criterion for nilpotent Lie groups to have a lattice given above does not apply to more general solvable Lie groups. It remains true that any lattice in a solvable Lie group is uniform and that lattices in solvable groups are finitely presented.

Not all finitely generated solvable groups are lattices in a Lie group. An algebraic criterion is that the group be polycyclic.

Lattices in semisimple Lie groups

Arithmetic groups and existence of lattices 

Generalising the construction above one gets the notion of an arithmetic lattice in a semisimple Lie group. Since all semisimple Lie groups can be defined over  a consequence of the arithmetic construction is that any semisimple Lie group contains a lattice.

Irreducibility 

Roughly, a lattice is then said to be irreducible if it does not come from this construction.

More formally, if  is the decomposition of  into simple factors, a lattice  is said to be irreducible if either of the following equivalent conditions hold: 

Rank 1 versus higher rank 

The semisimple Lie groups of real rank 1 without compact factors are (up to isogeny) those in the following list (see List of simple Lie groups):

The exceptional Lie group  (the real form of rank 1 corresponding to the exceptional Lie algebra ).

The real rank of a Lie group has a significant influence on the behaviour of the lattices it contains. In particular the behaviour of lattices in the first two families of groups (and to a lesser extent that of lattices in the latter two) differs much from that of irreducible lattices in groups of higher rank. For example:

Lattices in rank 1 Lie groups have infinite, infinite index normal subgroups while all normal subgroups of irreducible lattices in higher rank are either of finite index or contained in their center;

Kazhdan's property (T) 

The property known as (T) was introduced by Kazhdan to study the algebraic structure lattices in certain Lie groups when the classical, more geometric methods failed or at least were not as efficient. The fundamental result when studying lattices is the following:

A lattice in a locally compact group has property (T) if and only if the group itself has property (T). 

Using harmonic analysis it is possible to classify semisimple Lie groups according to whether or not they have the property. As a consequence we get the following result, further illustrating the dichotomy of the previous section:

Lattices in  do not have Kazhdan's property (T) while irreducible lattices in all other simple Lie groups do;

Finiteness properties 

Lattices in semisimple Lie groups are always finitely presented, and actually satisfy stronger finiteness conditions. For uniform lattices this is a direct consequence of cocompactness. In the non-uniform case this can be proved using reduction theory. It is easier to prove finite presentability for groups with Property (T); however, there is a geometric proof which works for all semisimple Lie groups.

Riemannian manifolds associated to lattices in Lie groups

Left-invariant metrics 

Interesting examples in this class of Riemannian spaces include compact flat manifolds and nilmanifolds.

Locally symmetric spaces 

A subgroup  acts freely, properly discontinuously on  if and only if it is discrete and torsion-free. The quotients  are called locally symmetric spaces. This correspondence can be extended to all lattices by adding orbifolds on the geometric side.

Lattices in p-adic Lie groups 

A class of groups with similar properties (with respect to lattices) to real semisimple Lie groups are semisimple algebraic groups over local fields of characteristic 0, for example the p-adic fields . There is an arithmetic construction similar to the real case, and the dichotomy between higher rank and rank one also holds in this case, in a more marked form. Then:

if r=1 then there are uncountably many commensurability classes of non-arithmetic lattices.

In the latter case all lattices are in fact free groups (up to finite index).

S-arithmetic groups 

More generally one can look at lattices in groups of the form

Usually  is allowed, in which case  is a real Lie group. An example of such a lattice is given by

.

This arithmetic construction can be generalised to obtain the notion of an S-arithmetic group. The Margulis arithmeticity theorem applies to this setting as well.

Lattices in adelic groups 

If  is a semisimple algebraic group over a number field  and  its adèle ring then the group  of adélic points is well-defined (modulo some technicalities) and it is a locally compact group which naturally contains the group  of -rational point as a discrete subgroup.

The strong approximation theorem relates the quotient  to more classical S-arithmetic quotients. This fact makes the adèle groups very effective as tools in the theory of automorphic forms. In particular modern forms of the trace formula are usually stated and proven for adélic groups rather than for Lie groups.

Rigidity

Rigidity results 

Another group of phenomena concerning lattices in semisimple algebraic groups is collectively known as rigidity. Here are three classical examples of results in this category.

Local rigidity results state that in most situations every subgroup which is sufficiently "close" to a lattice (in the intuitive sense, formalised by Chabauty topology or by the topology on a character variety) is actually conjugated to the original lattice by an element of the ambient Lie group. A consequence of local rigidity and the Kazhdan-Margulis theorem is Wang's theorem: in a given group (with a fixed Haar measure), for any v>0 there are only finitely many (up to conjugation) lattices with covolume bounded by v.

In particular, a lattice in a Lie group "remembers" the ambient Lie group through its group structure. The first statement is sometimes called strong rigidity and is due to George Mostow and Gopal Prasad (Mostow proved it for cocompact lattices and Prasad extended it to the general case).

Superrigidity provides (for Lie groups and algebraic groups over local fields of higher rank) a strengthening of both local and strong rigidity, dealing with arbitrary homomorphisms from a lattice in an algebraic group G into another algebraic group H. It was proven by Grigori Margulis and is an essential ingredient in the proof of his arithmeticity theorem.

Nonrigidity in low dimensions 

In this case there are in fact continuously many lattices and they give rise to Teichmüller spaces.

Nonuniform lattices in the group  are not locally rigid. In fact they are accumulation points (in the Chabauty topology) of lattices of smaller covolume, as demonstrated by hyperbolic Dehn surgery.

As lattices in rank-one p-adic groups are virtually free groups they are very non-rigid.

Tree lattices

Definition 

Let  be a tree with a cocompact group of automorphisms; for example,  can be a regular or biregular tree.

It is easily seen from the basic theory of group actions on trees that uniform tree lattices are virtually free groups. Thus the more interesting tree lattices are the non-uniform ones, equivalently those for which the quotient graph  is infinite. The existence of such lattices is not easy to see.

Tree lattices from algebraic groups 

In contrast to the characteristic 0 case such lattices can be nonuniform, and in this case they are never finitely generated.

Tree lattices from Bass–Serre theory 

Existence criterion 

The existence of a uniform lattice is equivalent to  being unimodular and the quotient  being finite. The general existence theorem is more subtle: it is necessary and sufficient that  be unimodular, and that the quotient  be of "finite volume" in a suitable sense (which can be expressed combinatorially in terms of the action of ), more general than the stronger condition that the quotient be finite (as proven by the very existence of nonuniform tree lattices).

Notes

References 

 

 

Algebraic groups
Differential geometry
Ergodic theory
Geometric group theory
Lie groups